The Latimore Tourist Home is a historic tourist accommodation at South Houston Avenue and West 5th Street in Russellville, Arkansas.  It is a two-story wood frame I-house, with a gabled roof, weatherboard siding, and stone foundation.  A two-story porch extends across its front facade.  Its construction date is uncertain, but before 1913.  It was used as an accommodation for traveling African Americans during the 20th century period of racial segregation and Jim Crow laws, and was described in 1949's The Negro Motorist Green Book.  It was moved in 2022 to its present location from its original location at South Houston Avenue and West 3rd Place.

The building was listed on the National Register of Historic Places in 2012.

See also
National Register of Historic Places listings in Pope County, Arkansas

References

Hotel buildings on the National Register of Historic Places in Arkansas
Buildings and structures in Russellville, Arkansas
I-houses in Arkansas
African-American history of Arkansas
African-American historic places